Chavi Vilaya  Gagananga (:complete title: Her Serene Highness Princess (Mom Chao) Chavi Vilaya Gagananga    ; 29 March 1881 – 14 November 1930) is a Princess of Siam, a member of Siamese royal family and a member of House of Gangananga a royal house which was originated by his father and descends from Chakri Dynasty.

Ancestry

References 

1881 births
1930 deaths
Chavi Vilaya Gagananga
Chavi Vilaya Gagananga
Chavi Vilaya Gagananga
19th-century Chakri dynasty
20th-century Chakri dynasty